HMS Partridge was a Royal Navy Admiralty M-class destroyer constructed and then operational in the First World War, later being sunk by enemy action in 1917. The destroyer was the sixth Royal Navy vessel to carry the name .

Design and construction
The Admiralty M class were improved and faster versions of the preceding . They displaced . Partridge was powered by three Brown-Curtis direct-drive impulse steam turbines, each driving one propeller shaft, with geared cruising turbines, using steam provided by three Yarrow boilers. The ships' complement was 76 officers and ratings.

The ships were armed with three single QF  Mark IV guns and two QF 2-pounder (40 mm) "pom-pom" anti-aircraft guns. The ships were also fitted with two above water twin mounts for  torpedoes.

The outbreak of the First World War in August 1914 resulted in the Admiralty placing a series of large orders for destroyers, to the design of the existing M-class to speed production. Partridge was one of 16 Admiralty M-class destroyers ordered as part of the Fourth War Construction Programme in February 1915. She was laid down at Swan Hunter's Wallsend shipyard in July 1915, launched on 4 March 1916 and completed in June that year.

Service
The vessel was assigned to the Fourteenth Destroyer Flotilla by July 1916. UC-44 completed her patrol unharmed.

The convoy was spotted by a flotilla of German destroyers and they unsuccessfully fought an engagement with the attacking destroyers, with Partridge being hit repeatedly by shells and torpedoes. The destroyer subsequently sank in the North Sea on 12 December 1917. Reports indicate that 97 of the crew were killed and only 24 were rescued. The wreck is believed to be off the Norwegian coast. One incident of reported heroism in the sinking, in which a Lieutenant Grey sacrificed a place in a life-raft for another officer resulted in the award of the Stanhope Gold Medal by the Royal Humane Society.

References

Bibliography

 

World War I destroyers of the United Kingdom
Admiralty M-class destroyers
1916 ships
Maritime incidents in 1917
World War I shipwrecks in the North Sea